The Lotto Belgium Tour is an elite women's professional road bicycle stage race, held in Belgium since 2012.

In the first year the tour consisted of three stages and grew with a team time trial to four stages in 2013.

The organisation is Vzw Belgium Ladies Cycling.

Past winners

References

External links 
http://www.lotto-belgiumtour.be/

Recurring sporting events established in 2012
Cycle races in Belgium
2012 establishments in Belgium
Lotto-Decca Tour
Women's road bicycle races